Grellier is a surname of French Huguenot origin. Notable people with the surname include:

 David Grellier (born 1979), French electronica musician
 Fabien Grellier (born 1994), French cyclist

See also
 

Surnames of French origin